Troglotayosicidae is a family of scorpions belonging to the order Scorpiones.

Genera
Only one genus is recognized:
 Troglotayosicus Lourenço, 1981

References

Scorpion families
Taxa named by Wilson R. Lourenço
Monogeneric arthropod families